The Phycitinae are a subfamily of snout moths (family Pyralidae). Even though the Pyralidae subfamilies are all quite diverse, Phycitinae stand out even by standards of their family: with over 600 genera considered valid and more than 4000 species placed here at present, they unite up more than three-quarters of living snout moth diversity. Together with the closely related Epipaschiinae, they are apparently the most advanced lineage of snout moths.

Phycitinae occur all over earth's land masses, except in completely inhospitable areas; the majority of species has a tropical distribution however. Phycitinae have even been found on very remote oceanic islands, and a few species have been intentionally or unintentionally distributed by humans beyond their native range.

The type species of this subfamily is Phycita roborella, under its junior synonym Tinea spissicella. That name was apparently first proposed by Johan Christian Fabricius in his 1776/1777 Genera insectorum but overlooked by subsequent authors, leading to many sources listing its origin as Fabricius' 1790s work Entomologia systematica.

Dioryctria abietella (Denis & Schiffermüller) has reproductive organs and spermatophore that are morphologically similar to those of other Lepidoptera. Many females had eggs in their bulla seminalis, but they didn't entirely obstruct sperm transportation. The spermatophore's opening end has a serrulate surface with a tiny horn. These microstructures are most likely used to keep the ductus seminalis opening aligned.

Description

In general, Phycitinae are smallish and slender-bodied moths, resembling fungus moths (family Tineidae) in appearance, though they have the well-developed proboscis typical of snout moths and in many cases also the tell-tale "snout" consisting of elongated and straight labial palps. They are usually inconspicuous; while the forewings of some are quite prominently patterned, even these have usually rather nondescript greyish-brown colours and in the natural environment the pattern is cryptic. Yet a few species of Phycitinae, such as Oncocera semirubella, are unusually brightly coloured by moth standards, while those of genus Myelois resemble members of unrelated "micromoth" family Yponomeutidae and like these are called "ermine moths" due to their bright white forewings with tiny black spots.

Despite their diversity, the group is considered by and large monophyletic as traditionally circumscribed. Due to the sheer number of taxa contained here, this has not been thoroughly tested, and some little-known genera traditionally included in the Phycitinae may of course simply be convergent and do not really belong here. Altogether however, the mesothorax of the caterpillars – with the sclerotised (hardened) ring around the base of seta SD1 – as well as the identical frenula of male and female adults' wings – a single bristle composed of several acanthae – are held to be characteristic autapomorphies by which the Phycitinae can be recognized. Furthermore, in the female genitalia of this subfamily the ductus seminalis originates in the corpus bursae. A useful character in the field is that the forewings of many adult Phycitinae lack one or more veins, usually the seventh one.

These moths may resemble caddisflies, but caddisfly antennae point forwards while Phycitinae antennae curve backwards.

Ecology

Phycitinae caterpillars are mostly leaf rolling, but some are inquilines in plant galls or seed feeders, and a wide range of habitats are utilized. This subfamily even features some aquatic and predatory caterpillars. The latter, e.g. Laetilia, can be beneficial in agriculture, as they eat small Hemiptera such as Sternorrhyncha. Others have been used in biological pest control against invasive plants, for example the stem-boring caterpillars of Arcola malloi which destroy alligator weed (Alternanthera philoxeroides), an originally South American plant that has spread around the Pacific Rim to the detriment of local ecosystems.

Yet again others – namely the "carob moths" and "flour moths" of genera Cadra, Ephestia and Plodia, as well as some species of Ectomyelois and Etiella – are themselves pests of economic significance; the aforementioned genera's caterpillars infest dry vegetable foods (such as grain and nuts), while others (e.g. Dioryctria) are pests of living plants. Ecological relationships and interaction with humans is not always clear cut in this large group; the famous South American cactus moth (Cactoblastis cactorum) from the Paraná Basin is quite beneficial by keeping down invasive prickly pears (Opuntia) wherever neither it nor these cacti are native, such as in Australia. It is a polyphagous species however, and having been introduced to comparable climates in Northern Hemisphere America, it is wreaking havoc in Mexican and the southern United States' Opuntia farms. Similarly, in A. philoxeroides control, care must be taken not to harm native species of the widespread genus Alternanthera, many of which are highly valued aquarium plants. A. malloi is also not fully monophagous and will for example eat sessile joyweed (A. sessilis), which though a nuisance weed where introduced is not known to be strongly invasive.

Systematics

Due to the large diversity, the phylogeny and systematics of the Phycitinae is by no means fully resolved, though there is progress towards this goal. As noted above, some genera placed in this subfamily might actually belong elsewhere; particularly some of those that cannot be assigned firmly to one of the main Phycitinae subdivisions (incertae sedis) are interesting in this regard. Delimitation versus the Epipaschiinae – generally considered the closest living relatives of the present subfamily – may thus warrant more attention, but altogether, considering the sheer size of this group, Phycitinae have not been particularly challenging as regards their taxonomy and systematics.

New genera of Phycitinae are still being established and others are revalidated in our time. Some genera widely recognized are monotypic, but might include further undiscovered species. Some, on the other hand, might not be valid. Despite the review of genera progressing, the large number of Phycitinae taxa means that a lot of genera have not been reviewed since the 1956 landmark studies by United States Department of Agriculture entomologist Carl Heinrich and Hans Georg Amsel of the State Museum of Natural History Karlsruhe, if not since longer.

Tribes

A large part of the subfamily is divided among four tribes of various size. Some notable genera and species are also listed:
Anerastiini Ragonot, 1885
 About 64 genera, see main article

Cabniini Roesler, 1968
 Cabnia
 Ernophthora
 Euageta

Cryptoblabini Roesler, 1968
 Balanomis
 Berastagia
 Cryptadia Turner, 1913
 Cryptoblabes
 Procunea Hampson, 1930 (=Kobesia Roesler, 1983)
 Pseudodavara Roesler & Küppers, 1979
 Spatulipalpia Ragonot, 1893

Phycitini
 About 150 genera, see main article

Genera incertae sedis

Some Phycitinae genera and species whose affiliation as to tribe is unclear are:

 Abachausia
 Afromylea
 Amyelois
 Anabasis
 Aspithroides
 Australephestiodes Neunzig, 1988
 Baphala Heinrich, 1956
 Cabotella
 Cantheleamima
 Caristanius
 Caviana
 Cavihemiptilocera
 Ceuthelea
 Chorrera
 Citripestis
 Coenochroa
 Coleothrix
 Davara
 Didia
 Difundella
 Elasmopalpus – lesser cornstalk borer
 Ephestiodes Ragonot, 1887
 Etielloides Shibuya, 1928
 Eulogia – broad-banded eulogia moth
 Furcata Du, Sung & Wu, 2005
 Genophantis
 Gunungia Roesler & Küppers, 1979
 Heras Heinrich, 1956
 Irakia Amsel, 1955
 Monoptilota – lima-bean vine borer
 Morosaphycita Horak, 1997
 Morosaphycita oculiferella
 Morosaphycita morosalis
 Nephopterygia Amsel, 1965
 Nevacolima Neunzig, 1994
 Oxybia Rebel, 1901
 Pararotruda Roesler, 1965
 Prorophora Ragonot, 1887
 Pseudanabasis Du, Sung & Wu, 2009
 Rhodophaea Guenée, 1845
 Rhynchephestia
 Rumatha Heinrich, 1939
 Salebriaria Heinrich, 1956
 Salinaria Rebel in Staudinger & Rebel, 1901
 Sematoneura Ragonot, 1888
 Thiallela Walker, 1863
 Tlascala Hulst, 1890
 Tsaraphycis Viette, 1970
 Tumoriala Neunzig & Solis, 2005
 Unadilla Hulst, 1890
 Unadilla bidensana
 Unadilla humeralis
 Zamagiria

Delcina was originally included in the Phycitinae, as it somewhat resembles Monoptilota; it seems impossible to assign with certainty to any one of the major lineages of snout moths however.

References

External links
 Dioryctria amatella, southern pine coneworm
 Elasmopalpus lignosellus, lesser cornstalk borer

 
Moth subfamilies

Taxa named by Philipp Christoph Zeller